William Ivor Poyntz (18 March 1894–1966) was a Welsh footballer who played in the Football League for Bradford (Park Avenue), Crewe Alexandra, Doncaster Rovers, Hartlepools United, Leeds United and Northampton Town.

References

1894 births
1966 deaths
Welsh footballers
Association football forwards
English Football League players
Llanelli Town A.F.C. players
Leeds United F.C. players
Doncaster Rovers F.C. players
Northampton Town F.C. players
Bradford (Park Avenue) A.F.C. players
Crewe Alexandra F.C. players
Hartlepool United F.C. players